Bobenheim-Roxheim is a municipality in the Rhein-Pfalz-Kreis, in Rhineland-Palatinate, Germany. It is situated approximately 5 km south of Worms, and 13 km northwest of Ludwigshafen. It is mentioned in the Wormser wall-building ordinance from around 900 as one of the places that shared responsibility for maintaining the city wall of Worms.

The people who worked in Bobenheim-Roxheim include Franziskus von Bettinger, Harald Braner and Albert Friedrich Speer.

References

Rhein-Pfalz-Kreis